Muscularis may refer to:
 Muscularis mucosae
 Muscularis externa or muscular layer